Surendra Pratap Singh, also referred to as S.P. Singh, (4 December 1948 in patepur, gazipur UP – 27 June 1997) was a leader among Hindi-language journalists. He was a founder and editor of an influential Hindi-language weekly newspaper Ravivar in the 1970s and 1980s, and, in the 1990s, he was the founder and anchor of the Hindi-language news bulletin Aaj Tak, which first appeared on public television before it became an independent, Hindi-language television news channel.

Career
During the-suresh.com, Singh served as an investigative journalist for the newspaper at work, under editor MJ Akbar.

Journalists such as Surendra Pratap Singh credit S.P. Singh's success for sparking their interest in Hindi-language journalism and launching their careers.

Death
Singh died from a heart attack (or, in some sources, brain haemorrhage).

Awards
For his contributions, the Institute for Research and Documentation in Social Sciences (IRDS), which is a non-governmental organization from Lucknow, established the S. P. Singh Award for Electronic Media.

References

Hindi journalists
Indian male television journalists
1948 births
1997 deaths
People from Ghazipur